Dan Vera (born South Texas) is an American poet and editor.

Career
Vera is the author of Speaking Wiri Wiri, (Red Hen Press, 2013) and The Space Between Our Danger and Delight, (Beothuk Books, 2009).  
His manuscript The Guide to Imaginary Monuments was selected by Orlando Ricardo Menes for the 2012 Letras Latinas/Red Hen Poetry Prize and published as Speaking Wiri Wiri.
In 2014, he was named one of LatinoStories.com's "Top 10 'New' Latino Authors to Watch (and Read)", calling him "a talented, sophisticated poet who is a master at playing with words".  In 2017, he was the recipient of the Oscar Wilde Award for LGBT poetry.

His work has appeared in The American Prospect, Foreign Policy in Focus, ''Poet Lore, Beltway Poetry Quarterly, Notre Dame Review, Delaware Poetry Review, Gargoyle Magazine, Konch, and Red Wheelbarrow.

Vera's poetry blends English and Spanish. As he explains:I love the English language. And I think one of the things that I love about the English language is the permeability of English to not only accept but also struggle with the incorporation of other languages like Spanish. So when I write, I'm constantly going back and forth between these two possible ways of articulating the world around me.

Vera is poetry editor of Origins Journal and past Managing Editor of White Crane.  He publishes other poets through Vrzhu Press and Souvenir Spoon Books. Vera is the co-editor, with ire'ne lara silva, of an essay anthology about Gloria Anzaldúa, Imaniman: Poets Writing in the Anzaldúan Borderlands, (Aunt Lute Books, 2016).

He founded Brookland Area Writers & Artists and serves on the boards of Split This Rock Poetry and Rainbow History Project.  His work as co-editor with Kim Roberts of the literary history site D.C. Writers' Homes was part of his effort to get to know Washington D.C.:I was just really fascinated to discover that writing and writers had existed in D.C. before me. I live in the Brookland neighborhood, and was fascinated to find out that Sterling Brown lived a few blocks from me and wanted to know more about him — that kind of started a progression of interest in writers, playwrights and poets and novelists who called Washington home.

Vera is a member of the prestigious Macondo Writers Workshop, the workshop founded by Sandra Cisneros. and a fellow of the CantoMundo Poetry Workshop.

Personal life
He lives in the Brookland neighborhood of Washington, D.C.

Works

Poetry collections

Poetry in anthologies

As editor
 , with ire'ne lara silva and an introduction by United States Poet Laureate Juan Felipe Herrera
 , with Malcolm Boyd and Bo Young

External links
 Official website
 , National Endowment for the Arts 
 , WAMU's "Metro Connection"
  Beltway Poetry Quarterly

References

21st-century American poets
Living people
American magazine editors
American male poets
American writers of Cuban descent
American gay writers
Hispanic and Latino American poets
LGBT Hispanic and Latino American people
American LGBT poets
Poets from Texas
Poets from Washington, D.C.
Writers from Washington, D.C.
Year of birth missing (living people)
21st-century American male writers
21st-century American non-fiction writers
American male non-fiction writers
LGBT people from Texas
LGBT people from Washington, D.C.
21st-century American LGBT people
Gay poets